Cowdray Park refers to 

Cowdray Park, Gauteng, a suburb of Johannesburg, South Africa
Cowdray Park, West Sussex, a country house and polo park in England